The Turning Point is a 1920 American drama film directed by J.A. Barry, written by Robert W. Chambers, and starring Katherine MacDonald, Leota Lorraine, Nigel Barrie, William V. Mong, Bartine Burkett, and William Clifford. It was released on February 2, 1920, by First National Exhibitors' Circuit.

Cast       
Katherine MacDonald as Diana Tennant
Leota Lorraine as Silvette Tennant
Nigel Barrie as James Edgerton
William V. Mong as Mr. Rivett
Bartine Burkett as Christine Rivett
William Clifford as Col. Follis Curmew
William Colvin as Jerry
Kenneth Harlan as Jack Rivett
Walter Hiers as Billy Inwood
Marion McDonald as Maid
Hedda Nova as Mrs. Wemyss
Edith Yorke as Mrs. Rivett

References

External links

1920 films
1920s English-language films
Silent American drama films
1920 drama films
First National Pictures films
American silent feature films
American black-and-white films
Films based on works by Robert W. Chambers
1920s American films